Dağlı Kuylucu Cave or Kuyluç Cave ( or Kuyluç Mağarası) is a pit cave located in Kastamonu Province, Turkey.

Dağlı Kuylucu Cave is situated at Dağlı village in Cide district of Kastamonu Province, northern Turkey. The cave was discovered in the early 1990s, and was explored by Boğaziçi University Cave Exploration Club in 1993.

References

    

Sinkholes of Turkey
Caves of Turkey
Landforms of Kastamonu Province
Cide District